Mirabella Fortress (Peovica) is a fortress located above town of Omiš in Split-Dalmatia County, in Dalmatia, Croatia.

Mirabella or Peovica is a Romanesque fortress, built in the 13th century above the town of Omiš By the Kačić family. Mirabella was a reliable hideout for the Omiš pirates who used to retreat into the safety of the Cetina gorge. Legend says that in 1537, during an attack by the Turks, the defenders of Omiš confused the attackers with their shouting and shots so much that the Turks overestimated the number of defenders and fled.

See also 
Omiš
Starigrad Fortress (Fortica)

References

Buildings and structures in Split-Dalmatia County
Forts in Croatia
Omiš